Post-nominal letters are letters placed after the name of a person to indicate that the individual holds a position, office, or honour.

An individual may use several different sets of post-nominal letters.  Honours are listed first in descending order of precedence, followed by degrees and memberships of learned societies in ascending order.

Some obsolete positions are not listed unless recipients who continue to use the post-nominals even after the order becomes obsolete are still living.

Antigua and Barbuda

Australia

Barbados

Belgium

Brunei

Cambodia

Canada

Hong Kong

Ireland

Italy

Jamaica

Malaysia

 List of post-nominal letters (Malaysia) by alphabetical order

Post-nominal letters of the Federal Authority and Federal Territories:
 List of post-nominal letters (Malaysia)

Post-nominal letters of sultanates:

 List of post-nominal letters (Johor)
 List of post-nominal letters (Kedah)
 List of post-nominal letters (Kelantan)
 List of post-nominal letters (Negeri Sembilan)
 List of post-nominal letters (Pahang)
 List of post-nominal letters (Perak)
 List of post-nominal letters (Perlis)
 List of post-nominal letters (Selangor)
 List of post-nominal letters (Terengganu)

Post-nominal letters of non-sultanal states:

 List of post-nominal letters (Malacca)
 List of post-nominal letters (Penang)
 List of post-nominal letters (Sabah)
 List of post-nominal letters (Sarawak)

Malta

Mauritius

Morocco
 Fellow of the World Amazigh Congress (FWAC)

New Zealand

Papua New Guinea

Philippines 

 Order of the Knights of Rizal
 Knight Grand Cross (KGCR)
 Knight Grand Officer (KGOR)
 Knight Commander (KCR)
 Knight Officer (KOR)  
 Knight (KR)  
Royal and Hashemite Order of the Pearl
Royal Companion (RCPS)
Grand Cordon (GCPS)
Distinguished Companion (DCPS)
Companion (CPS)
Officer (OPS)
Member (MPS)

Portugal

 ONSCV Order of Our Lady of Conception of Vila-Viçosa
 ROSMA Royal Order of Saint Michael of the Wing Order of Saint Michael of the Wing

Rhodesia

Saint Lucia

The Order of Saint Lucia comprises seven classes:

 Grand Cross of the Order of Saint Lucia (GCSL)
 Saint Lucia Cross (SLC)
 Saint Lucia Medal of Honour (SLMH)
 Saint Lucia Medal of Merit (SLMM)
 Saint Lucia Les Pitons Medal (SLPM)
 National Service Cross (NSC)
 National Service Medal (NSM)

Solomon Islands

Spain
 Grandee of Spain (GE)

Sri Lanka

Sweden
The following are abbreviations, but in Sweden rather used as prenominals, after the professional title in definite form followed by comma and before the full name. 
 Order of the Seraphim
 RoKavKMO/LoKavKMO - Knight/Member (of the cloth) and Commander of His Majesty's Orders (=Knight/Member (of the cloth) of the Order of Seraphim and Commander Grand Cross or Commander 1st Class of one of the orders Sword, Polar Star or Vasa, i.e. Swedish citizens)
 RSerafO/LSerafO - Knight/Member (of the cloth) of the Royal Order of the Seraphim (=have only received the Order of the Seraphim, i.e. foreign heads of state)
 Order of the Sword:
 Commander Grand Cross (KmstkSO)
 Knight Grand Cross 1st Class (RmstkSO1kl) (special class, in wartimes only)
 Knight Grand Cross 2nd Class (RmstkSO2kl) (special class, in wartimes only)
 Commander 1st Class (KSO1kl)
 Commander 2nd Class (KSO2kl)
 Knight 1st Class (RSO1kl)
 Knight (RSO)
 Cross of Merit (Svm)
 Order of the Polar Star:
 Commander Grand Cross (KmstkNO)
 Commander 1st Class (KNO1kl)
 Commander 2nd Class (KNO2kl)
 Knight/Member (of the cloth) 1st Class (RNO1kl/LNO1kl)
 Knight/Member (RNO/LNO)
 Order of Vasa:
 Commander Grand Cross (KmstkVO)
 Commander 1st Class (KVO1kl)
 Commander 2nd Class (KVO2kl)
 Knight/Member 1st Class (RVO1kl/LVO1kl)
 Knight/Member (RVO/LVO)
 Cross of Merit (Vt)
 Order of Charles XIII:
 Knight (RCXIII:sO) (insignia and rank as Commander 1st Class)
 Order of Saint John in Sweden:
 Knight of Justice (R-RJohO)
 Knight (RJohO)
 Royal Swedish Academy of Sciences:
 Fellow (LVA)

Thailand

Trinidad and Tobago

United Kingdom

United States

Zimbabwe

See also
 Suffix (name)
 Pre-nominal letters
 Commonwealth realms orders and decorations
 List of religious institutes

References

.
Lists of orders, decorations, and medals
Titles